Wes Archer is an American television animation director and storyboard artist.

Career
Archer was one of the original three animators (along with David Silverman and Bill Kopp) on The Simpsons, Tracey Ullman shorts, and subsequently directed a number of The Simpsons episodes (many of which had John Swartzwelder as an episode writer) before becoming supervising director at King of the Hill. A few years later he left King of the Hill to direct for Futurama, before eventually returning to King of the Hill. Wes continued to supervise the direction of King of the Hill until the final season. He acted as a consulting director for the last season of King of the Hill, as he joined The Goode Family as supervising director. Archer's college  animation film, "Jac Mac and Rad Boy, Go!" has long been a cult classic after receiving repeated airplay on USA Network's Night Flight in the 1980s. He studied at the Film Graphics/Experimental Animation Program at CalArts. He is currently the supervising director on Rick and Morty.

Archer's namesake also appears in an episode of King of the Hill (season 3, "Death and Texas"), in which Peggy is tricked into smuggling cocaine to an inmate on death row.  The antagonist of the episode, the inmate, was named Wesley Martin Archer. The name combined both Wes' and his brother and co-worker, Martin Archer.

Filmography
One Crazy Summer (1986) (animator)
The Simpsons (1990–1996) (director, sheet director, storyboard, storyboard artist)
King of the Hill (1997–2009) (supervising director, executive animation consultant, consulting director)
Eloise: The Animated Series (2006) (creative director)
The Goode Family (2009) (supervising director)
Bob's Burgers (2011–2013) (director)
Allen Gregory (2011) (director)
Murder Police (2013) (supervising director)
Rick and Morty (2015) (director, supervising director)
Disenchantment (2018) (director)

The Simpsons episodes
Season 1
"Homer's Odyssey"
"Moaning Lisa"
"The Call of the Simpsons"
"The Crepes of Wrath"

Season 2
"Treehouse of Horror"
"Two Cars in Every Garage and Three Eyes on Every Fish"
"Bart the Daredevil"
"One Fish, Two Fish, Blowfish, Blue Fish"
"Oh Brother, Where Art Thou?"
"Three Men and a Comic Book"

Season 3
"Mr. Lisa Goes to Washington"
"The Otto Show"

Season 4
"New Kid on the Block"
"I Love Lisa"

Season 5
"Rosebud"
"$pringfield (Or, How I Learned to Stop Worrying and Love Legalized Gambling)"
"Homer Loves Flanders"
"Lady Bouvier's Lover"

Season 6
"Itchy & Scratchy Land"
"Grampa vs. Sexual Inadequacy"
"Bart vs. Australia"

Season 7
"Who Shot Mr. Burns? (Part 2)"
"Bart Sells His Soul"
"Two Bad Neighbors"
"The Day the Violence Died"
"Homerpalooza"

Futurama episodes
"Kif Gets Knocked Up a Notch"
"The Why of Fry"

King of the Hill episodes
"Pilot"
"I Remember Mono"
"Death and Texas"
"To Kill a Ladybird"
"Queasy Rider"
"The Incredible Hank"

The Goode Family episodes
"Pilot"

Bob's Burgers episodes
"Hamburger Dinner Theater"
"Spaghetti Western and Meatballs"
"Bob Day Afternoon"
"Beefsquatch"
"Tina-Rannosaurus Wrecks"
"Nude Beach"
"Two for Tina"
"The Unnatural"

Allen Gregory episodes
"Full Blown Maids"

Rick and Morty episodes
"A Rickle in Time"
"Get Schwifty"
"The Wedding Squanchers"

Disenchantment episodes
"The Princess of Darkness"
"Dreamland Falls"
"Our Bodies, Our Elves"

External links
 
 @archermation on Instagram

American animators
American storyboard artists
American television directors
American animated film directors
California Institute of the Arts alumni
Living people
Primetime Emmy Award winners
Year of birth missing (living people)